The women's 3000 metres steeplechase at the 2019 World Athletics Championships was held at the Khalifa International Stadium in Doha, Qatar, from 27 to 30 September 2019.

Summary
World record holder Beatrice Chepkoech captured her first world title with a dominant performance in the women’s 3000 metres steeplechase at the World Championships in Doha. The 28-year-old Kenyan led the race from start to finish crossing the line in 8 minutes 57.84 seconds setting a championship record. At one point she led the field by 60 metres before defending champion Emma Coburn attempted to reign her in. The American, Coburn, captured the silver medal running a personal best of 9:03.35 finishing four and one-half seconds behind Chepkoech. Germany’s Gesa Felicitas Krause ran 9:03.30 to take the bronze medal for the second time at a world championship event and also set a new national record. Bahrain’s Winifred Yavi just missed the medal podium running a personal best of 9:05.68 to finish fourth.

Two other national records were established during the race; Denmark’s Anna Emilie Møller finished seventh with a time of 9:13.46 and Albania’s Luiza Gega ran 9:19.93 to finished ninth.

Race Details
When the gun sounded to start the final, Kenya's Beatrice Chepkoech wasted no time stepping off to the lead and quickly establishing an expanding gap between herself and the field; 15 metres by the first barrier, 20 metres in the first lap. This caused a seven-woman pack to form led by Bahrain's Winfred Yavi with top challengers Hyvin Kiyeng, defending champion Emma Coburn, and Peruth Chemutai tucked in behind Yavi. The pack was running at a brisk pace, too, but after one kilometre found themselves seven seconds behind Chepkoech.

Chepkoech covered the first kilometre in 2:52.95. She ran her second kilometre in 3:02.34 for a 2,000 metres time of 5:55.28.

At the 6:34 mark Chepkoech opened up a 60 metre lead over the field. Thirty seconds later, at the 7:04 mark, the American Coburn would make a bold move to separate herself from the pack and chase down the leader. The defending champion ran her final kilometre in 2:57 cutting Chepkoech lead by one-half, but it was too great a distance to overcome finishing four and one-half seconds behind the leader.

Chepkoech ran the final kilometer in 3:02.56 to finish at 8:57.84, capturing gold and establishing a championship record.

Fresh off her 2000 metres steeplechase world record a month earlier, Gesa Felicitas Krause ran a spectacular final lap passing two runners, Kiyeng and Yavi, to pick up the bronze medal.

Coburn improved her standing to #8 of all time fastest women's steeplechase list. Krause set her German national record and moved to #9 on the list; Yavi moved up to #11.  Anna Emilie Møller set a Danish national record in her preliminary heat and then improved upon it in the final.  Finally, Luiza Gega set an Albanian national record.

Of note, at the 6:26 mark and then in fifth place, Kenya's Celliphine Chespol withdrew from the race; she crossed over a water jump and appeared to have injured herself.

Records
Before the competition records were as follows:

Schedule
The event schedule, in local time (UTC+3), was as follows:

Results

Heats
Qualification: First 3 in each heat (Q) and the next 6 fastest (q) advanced to the final.

Final
The final was started on 30 September at 21:50.

References

Steeplechase
Steeplechase at the World Athletics Championships